Bukovje pri Slivnici is a village in the Municipality of Šentjur, in eastern Slovenia. The settlement, and the entire municipality, are included in the Savinja Statistical Region, which is in the Slovenian portion of the historical Duchy of Styria.

Name
The name of the settlement was changed from Bukovje to Bukovje pri Slivnici in 1953.

Church
The local church is dedicated to Saint Nicholas and belongs to the Parish of Slivnica pri Celju. It dates to the late 17th century.

References

External links
Bukovje pri Slivnici at Geopedia

Populated places in the Municipality of Šentjur